Manki or Mankipura is a village in Honnavar Taluk, Uttara Kannada district of Karnataka, India. It is located on the shore of the Arabian Sea and between Goa and Mangalore, about 100 km from Karwar. It lies on NH-66 running between Mumbai and Mangalore.

Apparently, it is the largest village in Karnataka and second largest village in India with dense forest and hefty mountains. Population consists of various castes and religions including  Ramakshatriyas(sherugar), Daivajna Brahmin, Gauda Saraswat Brahmin, Namadhari, Nakhuda, Nawayath, and Christians.

History
Manki was a part of Hoysala Empire from 1291 until 1343.

Hoysala empire :

Early inscriptions, dated 1078 and 1090, have implied that the Hoysalas were ancestors of the Yadava by referring to the Yadava vamsa (clan) as Hoysala vamsa. But there are no early records directly linking the Hoysalas to the Yadavas of North India. The downfall of Hoysala resulted in the rise of another super power. Manki later fell into the hands of the Vijayanagara Empire.

Vijayanagara Empire : (established 1336 - 1646)*

Vijayanagara Empire is referred as the Kingdom of Bisnaga by the Portuguese, it was an empire based in South India in the Deccan Plateau region. It was established in 1336 by Harihara I and his brother Bukka Raya I of the Yadava. The empire is named after its capital city of Vijayanagara, whose impressive ruins surround modern Hampi, now a World Heritage Site in modern Karnataka, India.

Vijayanagara Empire dominated all of Southern India and fought off invasions from the five established Deccan sultanates. The empire reached its peak during the rule of Krishnadevaraya when Vijayanagara armies were consistently victorious. Krishnadevaraya was followed by Achyuta Raya in 1530 and in 1542 by Sadasiva Raya while the real power lay with Aliya Rama Raya, the son-in-law of Krishnadevaraya, whose relationship with the Deccan Sultans who allied against him has been debated.

The empire went into a slow decline regionally. Eventually the Saluva rulers (Jain) of Hadwalli, a town on the State Highway leading to Jog Falls brought this desirable Village under their control.

There are not actual date, but Arabs came to Manki way before mughals, by sea and they introduced Islam and teachings of Islam. And they build first mosque of Manki in nakhuda mohalla. Now also there is similar culture of Arabs between muslims of Manki and nearby towns.

Geography
Manki is located at 11° 58' 01"  N 74° 34' 01" E. It has an average elevation of 3 metres (9.8 ft) and the time zone is (UTC+05:30) IST.

Languages
 "Kannada" Nakhuda "navayati" and"Konkani" are the most spoken languages alongside Konkani. Most of the Nawayaths are economic migrants working in various foreign countries, especially Saudi Arabia and Dubai; as a result they have mastered Arabic too.

Demographics
According to 2011 census, Manki had a population of 22,571: 11,154 male and 11,417 female.

The people of Manki are characteristically called Mankivasi.  Since the early 1940s, some of Nakhudas Nawayaths and Christians have migrated to various countries including the Middle East, especially Bahrain, Dubai, Qatar and Saudi Arabia.

Educational institutions
 Al-Hilal English medium school & Pre University College (PU college for Women)
 Madarasa Rahmaniya Manki
 Assisi Primary School Manki
 Goal International School Manki
 Government PU College Manki
 Government Urdu High School Manki
 Government High School Banasale
 Government First Grade College Manki
 Government Urdu primary school number 2 Manki
Manki also has some private schools.

Many of the students commute daily to nearby schools and colleges in taluk Honnavar and Bhatkal.

Manki has also recently counted nearly 20 educational institutions consisting of hostels, schools, colleges and anganwadis (nurseries).

References

D'Souza, V.S. The Nawayaths of Kanara- study in culture contacts. Page 12–20, KRI Monogs. No. 3. 2nd ed. Dharwar: Kannada Research Institute 1955.
Colonel Wilkes, History of Mysore, vol 1

External links
http://www.sahilonline.org/english/newsDetails.php?cid=1&nid=26434
http://mankirocks.webs.com/history.htm

Villages in Uttara Kannada district